Marinero may refer to:

Marinero, list of supermarket chains in Mexico
 "Marinero" (song), song by Maluma 2018
"El marinero", song composed by María Luisa Escobar
"El marinero", song composed by Ricardo Rico from Cha-Cha-Cha Boom!
El Marinero, ship on which María de las Mercedes Barbudo travelled
Marineros de Puerto Plata (2005–2009)